Wan Martina binti Wan Yusoff is a Malaysian medical practitioner and a politician who has been a Senator since 2021. She was elected a Senator by the Kelantan State Legislative Assembly on 24 August 2021 after being nominated by the Menteri Besar Ahmad Yakob. She has replaced Asmak Husin, whose term ended by 30 June. Prior to entering politics, she was the Chairman of Kelantan Prosperous Women Association (Wanis), as well as the Deputy Chairman of Dakwah Travel Mission Association (MKD).

References

External links 
 Wan Martina on Facebook

Living people
Malaysian Islamic Party politicians
Malaysian medical doctors
Malaysian people of Malay descent
Malaysian Muslims
Year of birth missing (living people)